Jabez W. Huntington (1788–1847) was a U.S. Senator from Connecticut. Senator Huntington may also refer to:

Abel Huntington (1777–1858), New York State Senate
George Huntington (Steuben County, NY) (1796–1866), New York State Senate
Samuel Huntington (Ohio politician) (1765–1817), Ohio State Senate
Terrie Huntington (fl. 2010s), Kansas State Senate